Hoss is a nickname of:

 Bill "Hoss" Allen (1922–1997), American radio disc jockey
 Ross Chastain (born 1992), American NASCAR driver
 Hoss Ellington (1935–2014), American NASCAR driver and team owner
 Hoss Hodgson (1886–1967), American football player and coach
 Jeff Hostetler (born 1961), former National Football League quarterback
 Waylon Jennings (1937–2002), American country music singer
 Hoss Wright, American rock drummer
 Eric "Hoss" Cartwright, one of the main characters on the TV series Bonanza

See also
 Old Hoss Radbourn (1854–1897), American professional baseball pitcher
 Corey Harrison, aka "Big Hoss", from the History Channel's Pawn Stars

Lists of people by nickname